Juan Domingo Buendía y Noriega (1816 – May 27, 1895) was a Peruvian military general who served as Prime Minister of Peru from 1877 to 1878. He commanded the Army of the South, which saw controversial action in the Tarapacá campaign of the War of the Pacific. He was also prefect of Lima, Cuzco, Arequipa, Tacna and Lambayeque, as well a deputy for Moquegua and Minister of War and Navy.

References

People from Lima
Peruvian soldiers
1816 births
1895 deaths
Peruvian people of Spanish descent
Peruvian military personnel of the War of the Pacific